Richard Carter or Rich Carter may refer to:

Arts and entertainment
 Richard Carter (actor) (1953–2019), Australian actor
 Richard Carter (musician) (fl. 1728–1757), English violinist and composer

Politics and government
 Richard Carter (MP for Cornwall) (1617–1668), MP for Cornwall
 Richard Henry Carter (1817–1880), Virginia planter, politician and Confederate officer during the American Civil War

Science
 Richard Carter (histopathologist) (born 1934), British histopathologist
 Rich Carter (born 1971), American chemistry professor

Sports
 Richard Carter (cricketer) (1891–1969), English cricketer
 Richard Carter (American football) (1919–2002), American football and basketball coach
 Dick Carter (1916–1969), American baseball pitcher, coach, and manager

Other
 Richard B. Carter (1877–1949), American ink manufacturer
 Richard Carter (land agent), English land agent and surveyor
 Richard Carter (Royal Navy officer) (died 1690), English officer in the Royal Navy
 Samuel Christian, founder of the Philadelphia Black Mafia who also went by the name Richard Carter

See also
 Rick Carter (born 1950), American production designer and art director